Chan Chun-po (born 30 October 1941) is a Taiwanese politician. He was the Vice Chairperson of the Kuomintang from 12 January 2007 to 30 April 2014.

KMT Secretary-General
Chan was appointed as  Secretary-General of Kuomintang for the second time on 9 September 2009  by KMT Chairperson Wu Po-hsiung. He was inaugurated to the post during the 18th National Congress of the Kuomintang on 17 October 2009 in Taipei.

References

Political office-holders in the Republic of China on Taiwan
Living people
1941 births
Harvard University alumni
National Chengchi University alumni
Tunghai University alumni